The Detour is an American sitcom that was created by Jason Jones and Samantha Bee about a family vacation road trip that quickly devolves out of control. It stars Jones himself, Natalie Zea, Ashley Gerasimovich, Liam Carroll, Daniella Pineda, Mary Grill, and Laura Benanti. The series aired on TBS from April 11, 2016, to August 20, 2019. The show was renewed for a second season on April 6, 2016, five days prior to the series premiere. The second season premiered on February 21, 2017. On April 25, 2017, TBS renewed the series for a third season.

On May 11, 2018, the series was renewed for a fourth season, which premiered on June 18, 2019. On September 4, 2019, TBS canceled the series after four seasons.

Plot
The series follows Nate Parker, Jr. (Jason Jones), his wife Robin Randall (Natalie Zea), and their kids, preteen twins Delilah (Ashley Gerasimovich) and Jared (Liam Carroll), as they drive from their home in Syracuse, New York to Florida for a family vacation. The trip experiences several dramatic delays such as car trouble, run-ins with law enforcement, unforeseen medical mishaps, and intervening locals. Nate had caused some professional trouble before leaving Syracuse and has ulterior motives for the Florida trip, which fuels flashbacks and a framing device involving several law-enforcement agencies and an interrogation into his unspecified crimes.

In season 2, the family settles in New York City as Nate finds a new career but more trouble as pieces of Robin's past resurface, including her relationship with her father, wanted felon J.R. Randall (James Cromwell). The framing device presents the couple being interrogated by the United States Postal Inspection Service as an attempt to get at J.R., led by the overzealous (and very pregnant) Agent Edie (Laura Benanti).

In season 3, the family flees to Alaska. This time the framing device involves Nate and Robin discussing their case with their lawyer, Joe Delicious (Max Casella). Jared becomes mayor of the town they settle in, Nate works on a fishing boat, and Robin becomes a stripper. 

In season 4, Delilah flees the rest of the Parkers as they try to track her down. This takes them to Tibet, Japan, New Zealand, and eventually back home to New York where she has apparently been the entire time. The season, and the series, ends with Nate apparently having gone off the grid, as he checks months of voice mail messages left for him. He then climbs into a van, which is immediately riddled with bullets and explodes; since the series was canceled shortly after the episode aired, Nate's fate is left unknown.

Cast 
 Jason Jones as Nate Parker Jr.
 Natalie Zea as Robin Randall and Bluejay "B.J." Randall 
 Ashley Gerasimovich as Delilah Parker
 Liam Carroll as Jared (Jareb) Parker
 Daniella Pineda as Vanessa Randall (season 1–3; voice only season 4)
 Mary Grill as Federal Agent Mary (season 1; guest season 2)
 Laura Benanti as USPIS Agent Edie Randall (season 3; recurring season 2; voice only season 4)

Recurring 
 Phil Reeves as Gene
 Jeffrey Vincent Parise as Carlos (Season 2)
 Tom Amandes as Dr. Rob (Season 1)
 Judge Reinhold as Davey (Season 1)
 Maz Jobrani as Gupta (Season 1)
 Weronika Rosati as Oksana (Season 1)
 Wayne Caparas as Lobsong (Season 1)
 James Cromwell as Jack "J.R." Randall (Seasons 2 and 4)
 Mamoudou Athie as USPIS Agent Carl (Season 2)
 Max Casella as Joe Delicious (Season 2–3)
 Darin Cooper as ICE Agent (Season 1)
 Vince Foster as USDA Agent (Season 1)
 Deja Dee as DEA Agent (Season 1)
 Taylor Kowalski as Billy Evans (Season 1)
 Adam Boyer as Morris (Season 1)
 Denitra Isler as Latisha (Season 1)
 Mary Kraft as Shelly
 Angelina Lewis as Svetlana (Season 1)
 Paul Cuneo as Carl (Season 1)
 Sebastian Greco as Caleb (Season 1)
 Britt Rentschler as Melissa (Season 1)
 Samuel Vielma as Marco (Season 1)
 Jonathan D. Williams as Paul (Season 1)
 Jenna Bryant as Rebecca (Season 1)
 Jeff Blumenkrantz as Lars (Season 2)
 Teddy Canez as Conrad (Season 2)
 Donshea Hopkins as Chase (Season 2)
 Marceline Hugot as Judith (Season 2)
 Catrina Ganey as Judge (Season 2)
 Meredith Henderhan as Stenographer (Season 2)
 Saverio Guerra as Paddy Greenberg (Season 2)
 Paloma Guzman as Carlita (Season 2)
 Perry Yung as Zhi (Season 2)
 Erik King as Harris (Season 2)
 Jocelyn Bioh as Isabel 
Ezra Romanov (Season 2)
 Kevin Townley as Martin (Season 2)
 Akira Ito as IRS Drone (Season 2)
 Jim Santangeli as SWAT Officer (Season 2)
 Amy Shiels as Nicole (Season 2)
 Souleymane Sy Savane as African Man (Season 2)
 Dave Hanson as Agent Randy (Season 2)
 Richard Nwaoko as Bobby (Season 2)
 Fletcher Bee-Jones as Young Nate
 Samantha Bee as Nate's Mother
 Rebecca Koon as Nate's Mother (Older) 
 Caitlynne Medrek as Nurse (Season 3)
 Blaine Schlechter as Janitor (Season 3)
 Christina Collard as Naomi (Season 2)

Development
TBS ordered the pilot, written by Jason Jones and Samantha Bee in October 2014. The show is based on the real life couple's own experience with family vacations.

It was picked up for ten episodes in February 2015. On April 6, 2016, the show was renewed for a second season before the premiere.

Episodes

Season 1 (2016)

Season 2 (2017)

Season 3 (2018)

Season 4 (2019)

Broadcast 

In Canada, The Detour premiered on April 21, 2016 on The Comedy Network.
In Latin America it premiered on June 9, 2016 on TBS Latin America. It premiered on Comedy Central India on October 5, 2016.

It is available in Australia on streaming service Stan as of January 2018.

Reception 
On Rotten Tomatoes, the first season has an approval rating of 78% based on 23 reviews, with an average rating of 6.9/10. The site's critical consensus reads, "Sometimes raunchy, but often honest and endearing, The Detour brings the laughs as the story tries to find its way." On Metacritic, the first season holds a score of 69 out of 100, based on 19 critics.

On Rotten Tomatoes, season two has an approval rating of 100% based on 5 reviews, with an average rating of 6.9/10. On Metacritic, season two has a weighted average score 77 out of 100, based on 4 critics, indicating "generally favorable reviews".

References 

2010s American single-camera sitcoms
2016 American television series debuts
2019 American television series endings
English-language television shows
TBS (American TV channel) original programming
Television series about dysfunctional families
Television series by Studio T